Jeffrey Nachmanoff (born March 9, 1967) is an American screenwriter and director. He wrote the screenplay for the 2004 blockbuster film The Day After Tomorrow. He wrote and directed Traitor, which was released on August 27, 2008. His most commercially successful films have been The Day After Tomorrow, which grossed US$544 million, He is the director of Replicas (2018).

Nachmanoff's family is Jewish.

Filmography
Film

Television

Unproduced work
Nachmanoff previously contributed to the script for Prince of Persia: The Sands of Time earlier in its development history.

Personal life
Nachmanoff's brother, Dave Nachmanoff, is a singer-songwriter and regularly supports Al Stewart. Jeffrey appears on his brother's album, Threads of Time.

References

External links

1967 births
Living people
American film directors
American male screenwriters